State Route 47 (SR 47) is a state highway running from the Indiana border at Union City to Waldo, about ten miles (16 km) south of Marion. In Bellefontaine, State Route 47 follows the path of different streets (even though neither are one-way) from Main Street and Sandusky Avenue to the intersection just north of Mary Rutan Hospital, about one-half mile north of the Main-Sandusky intersection. The westbound portion of State Route 47 goes down Main, while the eastbound portion goes north on Madriver Street during this stretch. Nobody really knows why the route was designated this way when none of the streets involved are one-way. It was State Route 68 until 1933, when U.S. Route 68 was commissioned. Since both roads run through a common county in Ohio (Logan), and also since there is a rule that there can be no Ohio State Routes with the same number as US highways within Ohio, the number was changed to 47.

Route description
The portion of SR 47 between SR 49 and US 127, near Ansonia in Darke County, is designated "Pfc. Douglas E. Dickey Memorial Highway", in honor of a United States Marine and Darke County native who was mortally wounded in combat on March 26, 1967 in Vietnam, and who posthumously received the Medal of Honor for heroism.

History

Major intersections

References

047
Transportation in Darke County, Ohio
Transportation in Shelby County, Ohio
Transportation in Logan County, Ohio
Transportation in Union County, Ohio
Transportation in Delaware County, Ohio
Transportation in Marion County, Ohio